Erika María Ender Simoes (born 21 December 1974) is a Panamanian-American singer and songwriter. In addition to her singing career, Ender is considered one of the most important and prolific composers in the Latin music market today. Along with Luis Fonsi and Daddy Yankee, she is the co-writer of the worldwide hit "Despacito".

Early life 
Ender was born in Panama City, the daughter of a Panamanian-American father and Brazilian mother. Due to her roots, she grew up in a multicultural and trilingual home, so she writes, sings and composes songs in Spanish, Portuguese and English. Ender currently resides in Miami, Florida.

Career 
As a singer, Ender has released five CDs—three of them international—in a variety of genres such as pop, rock, tropical and regional Mexican. Her musical versatility has made it possible for stars such as Daddy Yankee, Chayanne, Gloria Trevi, Ednita Nazario, Gilberto Santa Rosa, Ana Bárbara, Víctor Manuelle, Los Horóscopos de Durango, Milly Quezada, Elvis Crespo, Giselle, Melina León, Ha*Ash, Prince Royce, Akon, José Luis Rodríguez "El Puma", Luis Enrique, Luis Fonsi, Malú, Jaci Velásquez, and Azúcar Moreno, to interpret their songs.

Her successful career as a songwriter includes the albums Abreme La Puerta, Cueste Lo Que Cueste and En Concierto. Topping the Billboards with singles like "Cheque Al Portador" (2004), "Abreme La Puerta" (2004), "Luna Nueva" (2006), "Quien Sale... No Entra" (2006), "Masoquista" (2009), "Cadê?" and "Sigo Caminando", among others, have led to her performing in multiple countries.

A great accomplishment as a composer was when in 2004 her theme "Cheque Al Portador" allowed Ender to qualify at the International Song Festival of Viña del Mar, where she represented her native Panama for the first time in the 45 years since the event began in 1960.

In January 2017, "Despacito", featuring Daddy Yankee and Luis Fonsi and co-written by Ender, was promoted and released. The music video reached 6 billion views, with the song becoming number 1 in nearly every Latin Billboard chart.

Awards 
 Latin Billboard
 SESAC-Song Of The Year (2010)
 ASCAP
 Latin Grammy Awards
 Monitor Latino
 La Musa Latin Songwriters Hall of Fame Awards – 2017
 Premio Faro Cultural 2017 – Comunicad (Washington, DC)
 Best Mexican Regional Song 2016 – Latin Grammy
 Leading Ladies of Entertainment 2017 – Latin Recording Academy of Arts and Sciences
 Song of the Year 2017 – Latin Grammy
 Global Icon Award 2018 – SEASAC Latina Music Awards
 Top Latin Song 2018 – Billboard Music
 Horizon Award 2018 – The National Hispanic Foundation for the Arts
 Humanitarian Award 2018 – TJ Martell Foundation (Los Angeles, California)
 Top Hot 100 Canciones 2018 – Billboard Music
 Top Latin Song 2018 – Billboard Music
 Streaming Song of the Year 2018 – Latin Billboard
 Canción Pop Latina del Año 2018 – Billboard Latino
 Airplay Song of the Year 2018 – Billboard Latino
 Digital Song of the Year 2018 – Billboard Latino
 Top Selling Song 2018 – Billboard Latino
 Song of the Year 2018 – SESAC Latina Music Awards
 She Rocks Awards 2019 – Dreaming out Loud She Rocks Women in Music
 Philanthropy Award 2019 – Cala Foundation

Filmography 

Cinema:
Grandpa (2011), directed by Joseph Medina and produced by Edgardo Franco, better known as 'The General'.
It is the story of a grandfather and his grandson, who carry a close relationship of respect and affection. Unfortunately everything changes when the grandfather suffers an automobile accident and has to be admitted to a nursing home.

International trade:
Miami Herald, Florida Lottery, MCI (along with María Celeste Arrarás) and AmericaTel along with Don Francisco.

Musical Theatre:
The Narrator of José El Soñador, directed by the famous Bruce Quinn.

Judge or celebrity 
 Idol Kids Puerto Rico (2012) (next to Servando and Florentino, Edgardo Díaz and Carlos Ponce); Produced by FreeMantle Media for Wapa TV Puerto Rico.
 IDOL PUERTO RICO (2011) (along with Ricardo Montaner, Jerry Rivera and Carlos "Topy" Mamery); Produced by FreeMantle Media for Wapa TV Puerto Rico.
 Batalla de las Américas (2009) with María Conchita Alonso and Julio Iglesias Jr. (MEGA TV – USA, CHAIN 3 – Mexico and Venevisión International for Latin America).
 Dímelo Bailando (2004) (Mega TV – USA).
 Vive La Música on TVN Channel 2 – Panama.

Co-producer of programs 
 La Cuerda
 Vital (Fox World, Channel 8, Miami, USA).

Presenter 
 Life @ Online (Life Online): Discovery Channel USA and Latin America (1998–1999).
 El Mix del Fin de Semana: Telemetro Panamá (1995–1996).
 Salsarengue: Telemetro Panama (1995).
 Son de Sabor (segment Son del Patio): RPC TV Channel 4, Panama (1994).
 Eventos Especiales: TVN Channel 2, (1993–1994).

References

External links 

 Official website

1974 births
Living people
Panamanian people of American descent
Panamanian people of Brazilian descent
Latin Grammy Award winners
Latin pop singers
Latin music songwriters
21st-century American women singers
Women in Latin music
English-language singers from Panama
Portuguese-language singers of Panama
21st-century American singers